Pisidium milium is a species of very small freshwater bivalve in the family Sphaeriidae, the fingernail clams and pea clams.

Description
The 3.0- to 4.5-mm shell is  tumid (swollen). It is more rectangular than other Pisidium species and has broad, swollen umbos which lie behind the midpoint. The surface (periostracum)  is very glossy, with  irregular, concentric striae. The colour is yellow to pale brown.

Distribution 
The native distribution of this species is Holarctic.

 Czech Republic –in Bohemia, in Moravia, vulnerable (VU)
 Slovakia
 Germany – (Arten der Vorwarnliste)
 Nordic countries: Denmark, Faroes, Finland, Iceland, Norway and Sweden
Great Britain and Ireland

References

External links
Pisidium milium at Animalbase taxonomy,short description, biology,status (threats), images
Images at BOLD.

milium
Bivalves described in 1836